The Kitabatake clan was a clan that ruled south Ise Province in Japan and had strong ties to the eastern provinces through Pacific sea routes. Among its leaders included Kitabatake Tomonori.

Clan heads
 Kitabatake Masaie (1215–1274, founder)
 Kitabatake Morochika (1244–1315)
 Kitabatake Moroshige (1270–1322)
 Kitabatake Chikafusa (1293–1354)
 Kitabatake Akiyoshi (1326?–1383?)
 Kitabatake Akiyasu (1361?–1414)
 Kitabatake Mitsumasa (1382?–1429)
 Kitabatake Noritomo (1423–1471)
 Kitabatake Masasato (1449–1508)
 Kitabatake Kichika (1468–1518)
 Kitabatake Harutomo (1503–1563)
 Kitabatake Tomonori (1528–1576)
 Kitabatake Tomofusa (1547–1580)
 Kitabatake Tomotoyo (Oda Nobukatsu) (1558–1630)

See also
Kitabatake Shrine

References

External links
Kamon World 

Japanese clans
Minamoto clan